William Ortega Bobadilla (born July 24, 1975) is a Cuban former professional baseball player who played in five games for the St. Louis Cardinals in the 2001 season, all as a pinch hitter. He batted and threw right-handed.

In Cuba, Ortega watched Major League Baseball games on videotapes which had been smuggled out of Guantanamo Bay Naval Base. Before defecting, he played for Industriales in the Cuban National Series. Ortega defected from Cuba during an international baseball tournament in Mexico in November 1996, leaving a wife and two-year-old son behind in Cuba. He was signed by the Cardinals in 1997 after a tryout.

Ortega was an outfielder in the minor leagues. In his five major league pinch-hitting appearances, Ortega had one hit in five at-bats.

See also

List of baseball players who defected from Cuba

References

External links

1975 births
Living people
St. Louis Cardinals players
Nettuno Baseball Club players
Major League Baseball players from Cuba
Cuban expatriate baseball players in the United States
Industriales de La Habana players
Arkansas Travelers players
Expatriate baseball players in Italy
Memphis Redbirds players
Peoria Chiefs players
Potomac Cannons players
Prince William Cannons players
Cuban expatriate sportspeople in Italy
Defecting Cuban baseball players
Baseball players from Havana